Efutu may refer to:
Efutu people
Efutu language